Eaglemont is an established suburb of Melbourne, Victoria, Australia, 10 km north-east of Melbourne's Central Business District, located within the City of Banyule local government area. Eaglemont recorded a population of 3,960 at the 2021 census.

Formerly known as Mount Eagle, Eaglemont is a picturesque enclave situated between Ivanhoe East and Heidelberg. The heritage-laden garden suburb was designed by Walter Burley Griffin, playing home to many of Australia's most famous artists at the Heidelberg School of Art.

Walking distance to first class private schools, the Yarra River, parks, walking trails, shopping centers and a public golf course, the median house prices in Eaglemont remain amongst the highest in Melbourne, with the market for properties notoriously tough to break and few properties up for sale.

History

Two properties were built in the area in the 1840s; "Leighton" was built by the Bolden brothers, whilst "Hartlands" was built by novelist S. J. Browne. "Hartlands" was located on the elevated region known as Mount Eagle, and was subdivided in 1853. The area remained agricultural, apart from a large house and gardens, named "Mount Eagle", built in the late 1850s by parliamentarian J. H. Brooke.

During the landboom of the 1880s, the "Mount Eagle" and "Leighton" properties were bought by a syndicate and subdivided. The area was named Mount Eagle Estate. The "Mount Eagle" property failed to sell, and remained vacant until 1888 when it was made available to a group of artists. This group became known as the Heidelberg School, and included Tom Roberts, Arthur Streeton, Charles Conder, and Frederick McCubbin.

In 1915 Walter Burley Griffin and Marion Mahony Griffin were commissioned to design a subdivision in the Mount Eagle Estate. The design incorporated curving streets which followed the contours of the land, and private parklands, as an early example of a Garden Suburb design. In 1916 they designed the nearby Glenard Estate upon similar principles.  The Griffins designed numerous houses in the area, and later became residents of Eaglemont, living at 23 Glenard Drive in the small knitlock house 'Pholiota' They lived alongside the house of Walter's brother-in-law Roy Lippincott at no. 21.

Eaglemont Post Office opened on 14 October 1929 some time after the opening of the railway station in 1926.

Present

Eaglemont's small shopping strip includes a newsagency/licensed post office, cafes, grocery store and hairdressers, along with the Eagle Bar.
Eaglemont is well serviced by public transport, having its own railway station, as well as numerous bus routes and bike paths. Public library facilities are provided by Yarra Plenty Regional Library.  The nearest libraries are at Ivanhoe and Rosanna.

Notable residents

Eaglemont has been home to many notable residents over the years, many of whom have been involved in the artistic professions, including:

 Shane Jacobson actor
 Harold Desbrowe Annear architect
 Robin Boyd architect
 Charles Conder artist
 Marion Mahony Griffin architect and artist
 Murray Griffin artist
 Walter Burley Griffin architect and town planner
 Frederick McCubbin artist
 Tom Roberts artist
 Frederick Romberg architect
 Arthur Streeton artist
 Walter Withers artist
 Cate Blanchett actress 
Charlotte inglis
Looom bands

See also
 City of Heidelberg Eaglemont was previously within this former local government area.

References

External links

Suburbs of Melbourne
Suburbs of the City of Banyule
Cities planned by Walter Burley Griffin